Honoré Champion (1846–1913) was a French publisher. He founded Éditions Honoré Champion in 1874 and published scientific works geared towards laymen, particularly concerning history and literature.

Champion died from an embolism on 8 April 1913 in his apartment at 30 rue Jacob, Paris. His tomb, located at the Montparnasse Cemetery, was sculpted by Albert Bartholomé.

His sons were Edouard Champion, who took over the publishing house, and the historian Pierre Champion.

References

French book publishers (people)
1846 births
1913 deaths
Burials at Montparnasse Cemetery
French male writers
Members of the Ligue de la patrie française